Chitinimonas is a genus of  Gram-negative, chitinolytic, rod-shaped bacteria which have flagella from the family of Burkholderiaceae which belongs to the class  Betaproteobacteria. All species of Chitinimonas have been found in regions of Asia. Species of this genus are found to be both aerobic and anaerobic. Chitinimonas is optimally grown and cultured at 25 °C to 37 °C, with very little concentrations of NaCl.

Species 

Chitinimonas taiwanensis

Chitinimonas koreensis

Chitinimonas prasina

Chitinimonas naiadis

Chitinimonas viridis

Chitinimonas lacunae

References

Burkholderiaceae
Bacteria genera